The 2021 Vuelta a Murcia was the 41st edition of the Vuelta a Murcia road cycling race. It was held on 23 May 2021 in the titular region of southeastern Spain as a category 1.1 event on the 2021 UCI Europe Tour calendar. Due to the COVID-19 pandemic, the race was postponed from mid-February to late May. As a result, the race reverted to the one-day nature it had previously held before 2019.

It was won by Alcantarilla-born Antonio Jesús Soto, who was part of the race's initial breakaway. During the rain-soaked race, Soto dropped his breakaway companions on the last climb and soloed to victory, his first ever as a professional. The chasing bunch finished just over half a minute after Soto, with Ángel Madrazo winning the sprint for second ahead of Gonzalo Serrano, who rounded out the podium.

Teams 
Three UCI WorldTeams, seven UCI ProTeams, and five UCI Continental teams made up the fifteen teams that participated in the race. Of the 100 riders to start the race, only 46 finished, with a further 17 riders finishing over the time limit.

UCI WorldTeams

 
 
 

UCI ProTeams

 
 
 
 
 
 
 

UCI Continental Teams

Results

References 

2021
Vuelta a Murcia
Vuelta a Murcia
Vuelta a Murcia